Carrollton Bridge, also known as Carroll County Bridge #132, is a historic closed-spandrel arch bridge that spans the Wabash River in Adams Township, Deer Creek Township, and Tippecanoe Township, Carroll County, Indiana. It was designed by Daniel B. Luten and built in 1927. It consists of six reinforced concrete arches.

It was listed on the National Register of Historic Places in 2003.

References

Arch bridges in the United States
Road bridges on the National Register of Historic Places in Indiana
Bridges completed in 1927
Transportation buildings and structures in Carroll County, Indiana
National Register of Historic Places in Carroll County, Indiana
Concrete bridges in the United States